Harald "Harry" Blau (German: Harald "Harry" Carl Adolf Blau, Latvian: Haralds Kārlis Ādolfs Blaus, ; 6 February 1885 – 4 June 1944) was a Latvian sport shooter of Baltic German origin who competed in the 1912 Summer Olympics representing the Russian Empire. He won the bronze medal in the trap event. He also competed in the 100 metre running deer, single shots event finishing 20th and as part of the 100 metre running deer, single shots team finishing fifth.

References

External links
profile

1885 births
1944 deaths
Latvian male sport shooters
Male sport shooters from the Russian Empire
Shooters at the 1912 Summer Olympics
Olympic competitors for the Russian Empire
Trap and double trap shooters
Olympic medalists in shooting
Medalists at the 1912 Summer Olympics
Baltic-German people
People from Madona Municipality